CFA-AFC Professional Coach, formally Chinese Football Association–Asian Football Confederation Professional Coach, is the football coach who registered with the Chinese Football Association and hold the AFC Professional Coaching Diploma, which is the highest level of coaching accreditation issued by the Asian Football Confederation.

On 2 June 2019, Chinese Football Association accepted professional qualification certificate of AFC Coach Convention issued by AFC President Salman Bin Ibrahim Al-Khalifa. According to the regulations of the convention, the Chinese Football Association will have the right to separately organize AFC's B, A and professional coach training courses, issue AFC coaching level certificates and diplomas, and be recognized by AFC.

The CFA-AFC Professional Coaches Diploma are valid for two years. Coaches whose diplomas have expired or are about to expire need to complete retraining to extend their qualifications, otherwise they will lose their professional coaching qualifications. As of December 2019, the Chinese Football Association has a total of 89 qualified professional coaches.

Professional coaches

Expire in 2021 
As of 21 June 2019.

Expired in 2019 
As of 21 June 2019.

See also
AFC Professional Coaching Diploma
Chinese Football Association
Asian Football Confederation

References

Asian Football Confederation